Dieter Dunkel is a German lightweight boxer who won the bronze medal of world championships in Rome, 1978. He competed for the SC Dynamo Berlin / Sportvereinigung (SV) Dynamo.

References 

Lightweight boxers
Living people
German male boxers
Place of birth missing (living people)
Year of birth missing (living people)